John Stanley Smiley (January 20, 1885 – August 21, 1945) was a Canadian politician. He represented the electoral district of Cumberland in the Nova Scotia House of Assembly from 1933 to 1937. He was a member of the Nova Scotia Liberal Party.

Smiley was born in 1885 at Milltown, New Brunswick. He was educated at Mount Allison University and Dalhousie University, and was a lawyer by career. He married Celia Ganong Kierstead in 1909. Smiley first attempted to enter provincial politics in the 1928 election, but was defeated. He ran again in 1933, and was elected in the dual-member Cumberland County riding with Conservative Percy Chapman Black. In the 1937 election, Smiley was defeated by the two Conservative candidates, Black and Archie B. Smith. In 1938, Smiley was appointed a judge of the Nova Scotia Supreme Court. Smiley died at Halifax on August 21, 1945.

References

1885 births
1945 deaths
Dalhousie University alumni
Judges in Nova Scotia
Mount Allison University alumni
Nova Scotia Liberal Party MLAs
People from Cumberland County, Nova Scotia
People from St. Stephen, New Brunswick